Joe Walsh (born 25 December 1988) is a former professional rugby league footballer who played for Harlequins RL and Huddersfield Giants.

He was born in Saddleworth, Oldham, Greater Manchester, and is a former Rishworth school pupil.

References

External links
 Quins RL profile
 Young prop Walsh signs for Bulls
(archived by web.archive.org) Mac Full of Praise
 Joe Walsh has been a godsend to us

1988 births
Living people
English rugby league players
London Broncos players
Huddersfield Giants players
People from Saddleworth
Rugby league locks
Rugby league players from Oldham